The 1973 Reading District Council election was the first election to the reconstituted Reading Borough Council, which changed from being a county borough to a non-metropolitan district under the Local Government Act 1972. At the time of the election it had yet to be decided whether the new district would hold borough status and so contemporary reports describe the election as being to "Reading District Council", although it was subsequently confirmed that the new council would be a borough.

The elections were held on 7 June 1973, in common with other new non-metropolitan district councils in England and Wales. The councillors elected in 1973 were to shadow the outgoing corporation until they formally took over on 1 April 1974. The election left the council with no overall control, with Labour winning most votes by a very narrow margin, but holding the same number of seats (16) as the Conservatives. The Liberals with 14 seats held the balance of power.

The Labour leader on the old corporation was Bob Towner and the Conservative leader was Edward Busby. Both led their parties into the elections, but neither man stood for a seat on the new council. After the election, Chris Goodall was appointed Labour group leader, and William Badnall the Conservative group leader. The Liberal group leader remained Jim Day, who had been party leader on the old corporation. A Labour / Liberal administration was eventually formed, with Jim Day being appointed to the council's top political job as chair of the policy committee.

Results

Ward results
The results in each ward were as follows:

By-elections 19731976

The Whitley ward by-election in 1975 was triggered by the resignation of Labour councillor Bert Williams.

References

1973 English local elections
1973